Saúl González Herrera (14 November 1915 in Vicente Guerrero, Chihuahua – 22 October 2006 in Chihuahua, Chihuahua)
was a Mexican lawyer and politician, affiliated with the Revolutionary Institutional Party (PRI). He served as Governor of Chihuahua from 1985 to 1986.

Saúl González Herrera had extensive experience in Chihuahua state politics. He served as Rector of the Autonomous University of Chihuahua from 1959 to 1962, served in the federal Chamber of Deputies during the 46th Congress (1964 to 1967), and was General Director of the state-controlled corporation Productos Forestales de la Tarahumara (PROFORTARAH)
In 1980 Governor Óscar Ornelas appointed him State Treasurer; following Ornelas's forced resignation from the governorship on 19 September 1985, González Herrera was appointed interim governor to complete his six-year mandate.

During González's period as governor, the 1986 state election was held, which saw  Francisco Barrio Terrazas of the National Action Party (PAN) compete against Fernando Baeza Meléndez of the PRI; 
the official result was a victory for the latter, but suspicions of electoral fraud marred the election and Baeza Meléndez's time in office.

Saúl González was elected to the Senate for the period 1988–94, representing Chihuahua for the PRI.
In 1994 he was elected to the Chamber of Deputies for Chihuahua's Fifth District to serve during the  56th Congress.

At the end of his senatorial period, he returned to his private practice as a notary public. He died on 22  October 2006 in the city of Chihuahua.

References

Governors of Chihuahua (state)
Politicians from Chihuahua (state)
1915 births
2006 deaths
Institutional Revolutionary Party politicians
Members of the Senate of the Republic (Mexico)
Presidents of the Chamber of Deputies (Mexico)
Autonomous University of Chihuahua alumni
20th-century Mexican politicians
Heads of universities and colleges in Mexico